Robshaw is an English surname, and may refer to one of the following:

Chris Robshaw (born 1986), English rugby union player
Harry Robshaw (1927–1990), English professional footballer
Matt Robshaw, British cryptographer

See also
Robert Shaw (disambiguation)

Surnames of English origin